Platymantis vitiensis (common names: Fiji tree frog, Levuka wrinkled ground frog) is a species of frog in the family Ceratobatrachidae.
It is one of two endemic frogs in Fiji, the other being the closely related Platymantis vitianus (Viti Wrinkled ground frog or Fiji ground frog).

Habitat and distribution 
Platymantis vitiensis is a locally common species that lives in moist tropical lowland forest, in particular near streams. It can also be found in lesser numbers in gardens, plantations, and in pandans in pastureland. It is found on Ovalau, Taveuni, Vanua Levu and Viti Levu. It is threatened by habitat loss on these islands, particularly due to the increase in conversion of native forest to plantations.

References

External links

 

Platymantis
Frogs of Fiji
Endemic fauna of Fiji
Taxonomy articles created by Polbot
Taxa named by Charles Frédéric Girard
Taxobox binomials not recognized by IUCN